Rebecca Sieff Hospital (also Ziv Medical Center) is a general hospital in Safed, Israel that serves the residents of Safed, the Upper Galilee and the northern Golan Heights. Sieff Hospital has 310 beds and serves as a regional trauma center in the event of accidents, natural disasters, terror attacks and war. It is also serves as a teaching hospital associated with Bar-Ilan University’s school of medicine which is also located in Safed. The hospital also operates an urgent care center in Kiryat Shmona.

Patients include Jews, Muslims, Christians and Druze.

The maternity ward and pediatrics unit are the hospital's major departments. In 2007, there were 2,900 births (an average of 8 births a day) and 3,000 children were admitted to the pediatrics unit. The neonatal ICU and the Child Development Center offer health care for babies and children together with a team of medical clowns. The Accident and Emergency Department treated over 60,000 patients in 2007 and its Trauma Unit played an important role in the 2006 Lebanon War.

During the 2006 Lebanon War, the hospital suffered a direct rocket hit, which caused damage to the infrastructure, as well as injuring five patients, 2 doctors and two other staff members.

Since the outbreak of the Syrian Civil War in January 2014, the hospital has been treating Syrians injured in the fighting.  An estimated 9 million dollars has been invested in treating Syrian refugees alone. The Israeli Defense Forces and the Israeli government cover two thirds of the cost, while a third is covered by the hospital itself.

In 2014, Salman Zarka was appointed director-general of the hospital, replacing its long-time director Oscar Embon. Zarka, born in Peki'in in the Upper Galilee, is the first Druze to head an Israeli hospital.

See also
Health care in Israel
List of hospitals in Israel

References

Hospitals in Israel
History of Safed
1910s establishments in Ottoman Syria